Gianluca Sordo (born 2 December 1969) is an Italian former professional footballer who played as a defensive midfielder.

Club career
Sordo was born in Carrara, Tuscany. He made his professional debuts at not yet 18 with Torino FC, remaining seven seasons with the club. In the final of the 1991–92 UEFA Cup, in the dying minutes of the second leg against AFC Ajax, after a 2–2 draw in Italy, he hit the post in an eventual 0–0 draw (and aggregate loss). In 1993, he appeared in both legs of Toros conquest of the Coppa Italia, a 5–5 aggregate win over A.S. Roma.

Sordo moved to Serie A giants A.C. Milan for 1994–95, being rarely used by Fabio Capello over the course of two seasons. Subsequently, he did not settle with a team, playing with A.C. Reggiana 1919, A.S. Bari and U.S. Città di Palermo, and also briefly represented AS Cannes in the French Ligue 2.

Sordo retired from football at the age of 34, most of his last years being spent in the lower leagues.

International career
Sordo represented Italy under-21s during three years, helping it win the 1992 UEFA European Championship.

Later that year, he played Olympic football in Barcelona with Italy, appearing in three games in an eventual round-of-16 exit at the hands of eventual champions and hosts Spain.

Personal life
Sordo married Laura Serra. In early April 2005, he fell into a coma after being attacked by two men in a bar in Marina di Massa, in his native region.

Honours

ClubTorino Coppa Italia: 1992–93; Runner-up 1987–88
 UEFA Cup: Runner-up 1991–92Milan Serie A: 1995–96
 Supercoppa Italiana: 1994
 UEFA Super Cup: 1994

InternationalItaly U-21'
 UEFA European Under-21 Football Championship: 1992

References

External links

National team data  

1969 births
Living people
Italian footballers
Association football midfielders
Serie A players
Serie B players
Serie C players
Torino F.C. players
A.C. Milan players
A.C. Reggiana 1919 players
S.S.C. Bari players
Palermo F.C. players
Montevarchi Calcio Aquila 1902 players
Pisa S.C. players
S.S. Arezzo players
Ligue 2 players
AS Cannes players
Italy under-21 international footballers
Footballers at the 1992 Summer Olympics
Olympic footballers of Italy
Italian expatriate footballers
Expatriate footballers in France